Slobodan Unkovski (born 1948) is a Macedonian director and university professor. He is known for TV Skopje show Bušava azbuka.

Early life 
Slobodan Unkovski was born in Skopje in 1948. He graduated in directing at the Academy of Theatre, Film, Radio and Television in Belgrade in 1971 in the class of Vjekoslav Afrić. He was also the Minister of Culture in the Macedonian government.

Career 
Unkovski directed numerous plays for the Yugoslav Drama Theater; such as Croatian Faust by Slobodan Šnajder in 1982, Cabaret Balkan by Dejan Dukovski in 1995, Milena Marković's Ship for the Dolls in 2006, William Shakespeare's As You Like It in 2009.

Unkovski is also known for directing TV movies based on dramas by Goran Stefanovski.

Selected works 
 An ordinary story, March 8, 1969, Belgrade, Yugoslav Drama Theatre
 Croatian Faust, December 7, 1982, Belgrade, Yugoslav Drama Theatre
 Tattooed souls, February 10, 1986, Belgrade, Zvezdara theatre
 Theater illusions, March 4, 1991, Belgrade, Yugoslav Drama Theatre
 Cabaret Balkan, March 18, 1995, Belgrade, Yugoslav Drama Theatre
 Ship for Dolls, June 5, 2006, Belgrade, Yugoslav Drama Theatre
 Figaro's Marriage and Divorce, November 16, 2006, Belgrade, National Theatre
 As you like it, November 20, 2009, Belgrade, Yugoslav Drama Theatre
 Mandragola, December 16, 2009, Belgrade, Madlenijanum
 It's not death, a bicycle (to have it stolen from you), June 17, 2011, Belgrade, Yugoslav Drama Theatre
 Life is a dream, January 23, 2012, Belgrade, National Theatre
 Einstein's dreams, October 15, 2017, Belgrade, Yugoslav Drama Theatre

Awards 

 The best performance of the Sterijino pozorje (1975, 1980, 1983, 1985, 1990)
 Best MESS Performance (1973, 1979, 1983)
 Award for the best director at Gavela evenings
 Bojan Stupica Award

References

External links 

 

1948 births
Living people
Macedonian directors